Alef Vieira Santos (born Sep 10, 1993), known as Alef, is a Brazilian footballer who plays for Khonkaen United as a centre-back.

References

External links

1993 births
Living people
Brazilian footballers
Association football defenders
Campeonato Brasileiro Série B players
Campeonato Brasileiro Série A players
Thai League 1 players
Avaí FC players
Sport Club Internacional players
Paraná Clube players
Guarani FC players
Operário Futebol Clube (MS) players
Cuiabá Esporte Clube players
Suphanburi F.C. players
Brazilian expatriate footballers
Brazilian expatriate sportspeople in Thailand
Expatriate footballers in Thailand